Alexander William Gaskarth (born 14 December 1987) is an English-born American singer and songwriter. He is best known as the lead vocalist, rhythm guitarist, and primary songwriter for the American rock band All Time Low since its formation in 2003.

Career

Crew Fighters (2002–2003)
As a teenager, Gaskarth was part of a cover band named Crew Fighters. Soon after, he met Jack Barakat, who persuaded him to form and join All Time Low. All Time Low began doing covers of songs by Blink-182 and Green Day. Subsequently, the formation of the band was completed by Zack Merrick (bass, backing vocals) and Rian Dawson (drums, percussion), who also left Crew Fighters to join All Time Low.

All Time Low (2003–present)

Gaskarth started playing music with bandmate Jack Barakat in eighth grade. In ninth grade, they acquired Zack Merrick and Rian Dawson, forming All Time Low in 2003. They signed to Emerald Moon Records in 2004 while still in high school and released their debut EP, "The Three Words to Remember in Dealing with the End". In 2005, they released their debut studio album The Party Scene.

In 2006 the band signed with Hopeless Records. In 2007, they released a single "Dear Maria, Count Me In" that was certified Platinum in 2015 and in 2021 it was certified 2x Multi-Platinum. They also released their second studio album, So Wrong, It's Right, in 2007. In 2009, All Time Low released their third studio album Nothing Personal which debuted number 4 on the Billboard 200 chart. In 2010 the band released two CD/DVD packages, MTV Unplugged and the documentary/live concert Straight to DVD.

In 2011, the band signed with Interscope Records and released their fourth studio album Dirty Work. In early 2012, the band re-signed with Hopeless Records and released their fifth studio album Don't Panic. On 7 April 2015, All Time Low released their sixth studio album Future Hearts which reached number 2 on Billboard Hot 200 Albums Chart with 75,000 copies sold in its first week, and number 1 in the U.K official Album Charts with 19,400 copies being sold. In 2016, Straight to DVD 2: Past Present and Future Hearts was released. This is a sequel to Straight to DVD, documenting the past four years of the band as well as another live concert. In 2017, the band released a new song entitled "Dirty Laundry" and also reveals that they had left Hopeless Records and has signed with Fueled by Ramen one year prior. On 2 June 2017 the band released its seventh studio album Last Young Renegade. In the summer of 2018, the band released two new singles, Everything Is Fine and Birthday.

In 2023, on Valentine's Day, the band released a song ‘Modern Love,’ a new anti-dating anthem from their upcoming album, ‘Tell Me I’m Alive’ out March 17th on Fueled By Ramen.

Gaskarth has written songs with other bands such as 5 Seconds of Summer, McBusted, and Simple Plan. He hosted the podcast Full Frontal with bandmate Jack Barakat from 2013 to 2015. Full Frontal was rebranded as Crash Test Live per an announcement via Twitter in May of 2020 and transitioned to Twitch (service) as the show's live streaming platform while the show would remain available in audio-only format as well as in video format following each taping.

Gaskarth also hosted the 2015 and 2016 Alternative Press Music Awards along with bandmate Jack Barakat.

Simple Creatures (2019–present)

On 24 January 2019, Gaskarth announced he was forming a new group with Mark Hoppus of Blink-182 called Simple Creatures. A debut song named "Drug" was released with news of an upcoming EP slated for March. A single named "Strange Love" was also released.

Instruments 

During 2004–2008, Gaskarth used a variety of Gibson SG-X's. Around mid-2013, Gaskarth used a variety of custom-made Paul Reed Smith guitars, most notable the Mira. He stated in a Reddit AMA that he abandoned the instruments due to difficulties replacing parts while overseas.
Gaskarth currently uses Fender guitars, most notable the Mustang 90 models, although he has been seen using Telecasters, as well as some of their acoustic models. 
Gaskarth has also been seen using Gibson electric guitars.

Personal life
Gaskarth graduated from Dulaney High School in 2006. Gaskarth has two older half-sisters, Jilan and Helen, and had a half-brother, Tom, who died when Gaskarth was 12. In memory of him, Gaskarth got a rose tattoo on his left hand, and wrote the song "Lullabies".

Gaskarth married his long-time girlfriend Lisa Ruocco on 9 April 2016. The two have been in an on-and-off relationship since high school as the pair tried to balance the lifestyle change of Gaskarth as he was touring the world.

During the Covid-19 lockdown in 2020, Gaskarth, Jack Barakat and fellow crew members of All Time Low, started a live podcast on YouTube called Crash Test Live.

Vocal style 
Gaskarth has a tenor vocal style. His vocal range is from A2 to C#5.

Discography

As lead artist
All Time Low

Simple Creatures

As featured artist

As songwriter

References

Further reading
 
 
 
 
 
 

1987 births
Living people
American male singer-songwriters
English emigrants to the United States
English expatriates in the United States
English male singers
English male singer-songwriters
Musicians from Baltimore
Musicians from Essex
People from Towson, Maryland
Singer-songwriters from Maryland
21st-century American male singers
21st-century American singers
21st-century British male singers
21st-century English singers